Uzbekistan Second League is the third highest football league in Uzbekistan. The league  is headed by UFF.

Members of Uzbekistan Second League 2009

League format
In the second phase the league split into two groups each featuring five teams. The winner and runner-up of each group promote to First League

Second phase, season 2009
FK Khiva, Lokomotiv BFK Tashkent, FK Guliston and FK Kosonsoy are promoted to First Division

Group A

Group B

References

External links
Championat.uz: Standings and results
pfl.uz: Uzbekistan Professional League

Uzbekistan Second League seasons
3